Lobster Lake is a lake in Douglas County, Minnesota, in the United States.

Lobster Lake was named from the resemblance of its outline to a lobster.

See also
List of lakes in Minnesota

References

Lakes of Minnesota
Lakes of Douglas County, Minnesota